Lonely at the Top is the fourth album by British electronic producer, Lukid. It was released in October 2012 by Werkdiscs.

Music videos
The music video for the song Lonely at the Top features an animation by WendyVainity, an artist from Adelaide, South Australia

Track list

References

2012 albums
Ninja Tune albums